National Capital Power Station (NCPS) or  NTPC Dadri, is the power project to meet the power demand of National Capital Region (India). It has a huge coal-fired thermal power plant and a gas-fired plant and has a small township located in Uttar Pradesh, India for its employees. It is located in Gautam Budh Nagar district of Uttar Pradesh about 25 km from Ghaziabad and about 9 km from Dadri. It is nearly 48 km from New Delhi towards Hapur. The township has an area of about 500 acres over all. NTPC Dadri is a branch of National Thermal Power Corporation (NTPC).

Capacity 
NTPC Dadri is a unique power plant of NTPC group which has both coal based thermal plant and gas based thermal plant of 1820 MW and 829.78 MW respectively and 5 MW solar plant totaling 2654.78  MW

Coal based
The coal for the power plant is sourced from Piparwar Mines, Jharkhand. Source of water for the power plant is Upper Ganga Canal.

Gas based
The gas for the power plant is sourced from GAIL HBJ Pipeline, it also supports HSD as alternate fuel. Source of water for the power plant is Upper Ganga Canal.

Grand Total capacity is 2654.78 MW.

External links
 NTPC Dadri (Coal)
 NTPC Dadri (Gas)
 Facebook page NTPC Dadri

Natural gas-fired power stations in Uttar Pradesh
Coal-fired power stations in Uttar Pradesh
Dadri
1991 establishments in Uttar Pradesh
Energy infrastructure completed in 1991